Laniše (in older sources also Lanišče) is a dispersed settlement in the Municipality of Kamnik in the Upper Carniola region of Slovenia.

Name
The name Laniše is a dialect alteration of the older form Lanišče. The name is derived from the common noun lan 'flax', referring to a place where flax was grown.

Geography

Laniše is a scattered rural settlement in the upper part of the Tunjščica Valley. Tunjščica Creek, a tributary of the Pšata River, flows through the village from the north and the valley begins to widen at this point. The village lies in a protected position walled in by mountains on three sides, open only to the south, creating favorable conditions for fruit cultivation.

References

External links
Laniše on Geopedia

Populated places in the Municipality of Kamnik